Vidaurre Point is the ice-free south extremity of Nelson Island in the South Shetland Islands, Antarctica, also the west entrance point of Bononia Cove and east entrance point of Dorticum Cove on the south coast of the island. The area was visited by early 19th century sealers. The feature was named by Chile.

Location
Chilean mapping in 1951 and British mapping in 1968.

Maps
 Livingston Island to King George Island. Scale 1:200000. Admiralty Nautical Chart 1776. Taunton: UK Hydrographic Office, 1968
 South Shetland Islands. Scale 1:200000 topographic map No. 3373. DOS 610 - W 62 58. Tolworth, UK, 1968
 Antarctic Digital Database (ADD). Scale 1:250000 topographic map of Antarctica. Scientific Committee on Antarctic Research (SCAR). Since 1993, regularly upgraded and updated

Notes

References
 Vidaurre Point. SCAR Composite Gazetteer of Antarctica

External links
 Vidaurre Point. Adjusted Copernix satellite image

Headlands of the South Shetland Islands